John Brian Walsh (26 March 1932 – January 2001) was an English professional footballer.

Career
Walsh began his career playing non-league football before joining Arsenal as an amateur in March 1949 before signing professional for the club five months later. He played a handful of friendlies for Arsenal before being called up for national service in 1950. He returned to Highbury in 1952 and played regularly for the reserve side before making his debut on 26 September 1953 against Cardiff City. He went on to make just seventeen league appearances for the club before leaving as part of a deal which saw Cardiff City players Mike Tiddy and Gordon Nutt move to London and Walsh move the other way to Ninian Park.

He made his Cardiff debut in a 2–1 win over Preston North End and his performances on the wing saw him become popular with the Cardiff fans. He helped the club to two Welsh Cup's, including scoring twice against Cardiff's archrivals Swansea City in a South Wales derby final which ended 3–2 to the Bluebirds. In November 1961 he left Cardiff for £2,000 to sign for Newport County and spent two years at Somerton Park before retiring. He later went on to become an accountant, a profession he qualified for while playing in Cardiff.

Following his retirement from football he returned to live in South East England. Walsh died in Epsom on 19 December 2001.

Honors
Cardiff City

 Welsh Cup Winner: 2
 1955–56, 1958–59

References

1932 births
English footballers
Arsenal F.C. players
Cardiff City F.C. players
Newport County A.F.C. players
English Football League players
2001 deaths
Sportspeople from Aldershot
Association football wingers
Footballers from Hampshire